Schilsky is a surname. Notable people with the surname include:

 Friedrich Julius Schilsky (1848–1912), German entomologist
 Eric Schilsky (1898–1974), British sculptor